Two ships of the United States Navy have borne the name Cyclops, for the Cyclopes of Greek mythology, giants with only one eye.

 , was an ironclad steamer. Originally Kickapoo, she was rechristened Cyclops from 15 June to 10 August 1869, and then to Kewaydin.
 , was a collier launched in 1910. She served in World War I and disappeared at sea in March 1918.

Sources

United States Navy ship names